The Idaho Jr. Steelheads, also called the Idaho IceCats, were a junior ice hockey team based in McCall, Idaho. The team played in the Western States Hockey League (WSHL) and home games were held at Manchester Ice & Event Centre in McCall. The team previously played some home games at Idaho Ice World and CenturyLink Arena in Boise, the latter being the home of the ECHL Idaho Steelheads. The team had been one of the most successful in the WSHL, winning five Thorne Cup championships over six seasons and appeared in seven straight between 2010 and 2017.

History

The Idaho Junior Steelheads were founded by Idaho Hockey Foundation Inc. in 2009 as a 501(c)(3) non-profit entity. The Junior Steelheads, like their ECHL parent club the Idaho Steelheads, were named for a species of seagoing rainbow trout native to Idaho streams and rivers and popular with local anglers. The team was coached by former NHL Colorado Rockies draft pick and former Idaho Steelheads' head coach John Olver.

In the team's first season, the 2009–10 WSHL season, the Junior Steelheads finished second in the Western Division and clinched their first Thorne Cup playoff spot against the experienced Phoenix Polar Bears. The Junior Steelheads won the first game of the three game series 5–3, but Phoenix rallied winning the second game 3-2 in OT and the third game 2-1. During the season, the team received a four-day ban from the city of Boise after an incident at a practice when players missed a shot, they had to take off an article of equipment. An assistant coach told the AP the team was emulating a similar stunt done by the Tampa Bay Lightning.

On April 9, 2013, the Junior Steelheads defeated the Bay Area Seals 5–1 to win the first ever United Hockey Union junior ice hockey championship in a six-team tournament in Las Vegas, Nevada. Olver would leave the Jr. Steelheads to coach in the ECHL again with the Bakersfield Condors for the 2013–14 season and assistant Kyle Grabowski took over as head coach. Olver returned to the Jr. Steelheads after one season.

In 2017, the team changed its name to the Idaho IceCats after the ECHL Steelheads asked the organization to change their name to prevent confusion. The new logo is based on that of another previously Olver-coached team, the Tacoma Sabercats. After the 2017–18 season, Olver stepped down again, leading to the IceCats ceasing operations.

Season-by-season records

United Hockey Union National Championship Tournament
AAU Sanctioned Junior A National ChampionshipIn 2013 and 2014, the Midwest Junior Hockey League (MWJHL), Northern States Hockey League (NSHL), and the Western States Hockey League (WSHL) advanced two teams each to the tournament.There was no UHU tournament held after the 2015 season.

References

External links
 Idaho IceCats official site
 Official WSHL website

Steelheads
Ice hockey teams in Idaho